54 Persei is a single star in the northern constellation of Perseus. It is visible to the naked eye as a faint, yellow-hued star with an apparent visual magnitude of 4.93. The star is located approximately 220 light years away based on parallax, but is drifting closer with a radial velocity of −27 km/s.

This is an aging giant star with a stellar classification of G8+ IIIb, a star that has exhausted the supply of hydrogen at its core and expanded to more than nine times the girth of the Sun. It is around 580 million years old with 2.6 times the mass of the Sun.

References

G-type giants
Double stars

Perseus (constellation)
BD+34 860
Persei, 54
027348
020252
1343